James Plumptre (1771–1832) was an English clergyman and dramatist.

Life
James Plumptre was born at Cambridge on 2 October 1771, the third son of Robert Plumptre, President of Queens' College, Cambridge, by his wife, Anne Newcome. The writers Annabella ('Bell) and Anne Plumptre were his sisters. James was educated at Dr. Henry Newcome's school at Hackney, where he took part in amateur theatricals. In 1788 he entered Queens' College, Cambridge, but migrated to Clare Hall, where he graduated B.A. in 1792, M.A. in 1795, and B.D. in 1808. In 1793 he was elected fellow of Clare.

On 18 May 1812 he was presented to the living of Great Gransden, Huntingdonshire, which he held till his death there on 23 January 1832. He married Elizabeth Robinson in Cambridge on 6 June 1815, when he was nearly 44 and she nearly 45. ('James Plumptre's England: The Journals of a Tourist in the 1790s', ed. Ian Ousby. p.6).

Animal rights

Plumptre was one of the first preachers to mention the subject of animal rights from a Biblical perspective.  On 8 May 1796 he preached before the University of Cambridge on "The Duties of Man to the Brute Creation". As the Sabbath had been ordained for cattle and humans, Plumptre considered it a "national sin" for horses to be used on this day. His sermon was not well received and was considered by many to be beneath the dignity of the pulpit. Plumptre published Three Discourses on the Case of Animal Creation in 1816. In the Foreword he commented that since 1796 much had been done "to interest the minds of the public at large on the subject."

Works
He wrote plays, advocated the claims of the stage as a moral educator, and tried to improve its tone. He also wrote religious books. Besides pamphlets, letters, single sermons, and hymns, he published:

 ‘The Coventry Act; a Comedy,’ 1793.
 ‘A concise View of the History of Religious Knowledge,’ 1794.
 ‘Osway: a Tragedy,’ 1795.
 ‘The Lakers: a Comic Opera,’ 1798.
 ‘A Collection of Songs … selected and revised,’ 3 vols., 1806.
 ‘Four Discourses relating to the Stage,’ 1809.
 ‘The Vocal Repository,’ 1809.
 ‘The English Drama purified,’ 3 vols. 1812; a selection of expurgated plays. 
 ‘Three Discourses on the Case of Animal Creation,’ 1816.
 ‘The Experienced Butcher,’ 1816.
 ‘Original Dramas,’ 1818.
 ‘A Selection from the Fables by John Gay,’ 1823.
 ‘One Hundred Fables in Verse, by various Authors,’ 1825.
 ‘Robinson Crusoe, edited by Rev. James Plumptre,’ 1826; republished in 1882 by the S.P.C.K.
 ‘A Popular Commentary on the Bible,’ 2 vols. 1827.

References

Attribution

1771 births
1832 deaths
19th-century English Anglican priests
Alumni of Queens' College, Cambridge
English animal rights scholars
English dramatists and playwrights
Fellows of Clare College, Cambridge
English male dramatists and playwrights
People educated at Newcome's School